Karyn Pugliese (Pabàmàdiz)  is a Canadian broadcast journalist and communications specialist, of Algonquin and Italian descent. She is member of the Algonquins of Pikwàkanagàn First Nation in Ontario. She is a Nieman Fellow, Class of 2020, Harvard University and has been recognized by the Canadian Association of Journalists with a Charles Bury Award for her leadership supporting journalists and fighting for media rights. In 2018 the Academy of Canadian Cinema and Television presented Pugliese with the organization's annual Gordon Sinclair Award for distinguished achievement in journalism at the 6th Canadian Screen Awards. In 2019 Pugliese received the Hyman Solomon Award for Public Policy Journalism  and was the co-recipient with journalist Justin Brake for the Native American Journalists Association  (NAJA) 2019 Elias Boudinot Free Press Award. She was chosen for the twenty-fifth Martin Wise Goodman Canadian Nieman Fellowship at Harvard University. She won a National Newspaper Award for a series of columns written for the National Observer in 2021, where she is now editor-in-chief. She is a frequent commentator on CBC's Rosie Barton Live and the podcast Canadaland. Pugliese recently replaced the former host of the canadaLANDBACK series. The former host Ryan McMahon, left after some personal controversy and conflict with his producer.  

Pugliese is best known for her work as a journalist/Executive Director of news and current affairs at the Aboriginal Peoples Television Network, and as the host of ichannel's #FAQMP. Pugliese was also the Managing Editor of CBC's Investigative unit, overseeing television programming for the Fifth Estate and Marketplace.  She also worked at  Vision TV and as a Communications Director for the Assembly of First Nations. Pugliese is president of the Canadian Association of Journalists (2018-2020) and previously sat on the CAJ Ethics Committee. Pugliese has acted as a co-chair for the Night for Rights Gala, an event which raises approximately $140,000 annually for rights-based journalism programming, and is organized by Journalist for Human Rights, JHR. Pugliese is an ambassador for Journalist for Human Rights, and works with them to train young indigenous journalists. She frequently speaks in support of the organization. She is also a board member for Canadian Journalists for Free Expression (CJFE).

Early life
Pugliese was born and raised in Ottawa, Ontario, but frequently visited Pikwàkanagàn in her youth. Most of her close family lived off-reserve in Ottawa.

Pugliese dropped out of high school three times, eventually enrolling in an alternative high school where she earned her diploma.  Although she was a bright student, Pugliese had no intention of attending university, and wanted to be a bartender, until a high school teacher coaxed her into applying to Carleton University's journalism program.  She enrolled and graduated with a combined honours in Journalism and History in 1998.

Pugliese was in journalism school during the years of the Kanehsatake resistance, Ipperwash Crisis and standoff at Gustefsen Lake. She was so distressed by the way media covered these events, out of context and stereotyping Indigenous people "as angry warriors threatening an otherwise peaceful Canada," that when she attended her graduation ceremony at Pikwakanagan she was embarrassed to admit she'd studied journalism and told her people she was thinking about becoming historian instead. After graduating Pugliese worked short-term contracts at CBC Radio Ottawa's Morning Show, Sounds Like Canada and CTV television, Ottawa. As a single mother of a young child, Pugliese found it difficult to balance motherhood with the instability of a journalism career. For a time she left journalism and worked as a technical writer in the federal government. Around this time she returned to Carleton University to complete an M.A. in history. Her thesis  'So, where are you from?' Glimpsing the history of Ottawa-Gatineau's urban Indian communities is a history of the off-reserve community she grew up in.

Pugliese returned to journalism in 2000, after a professor put her in touch with the APTN. Pugliese became the APTN's first Parliamentary Correspondent. She credits the APTN's daycare policy and flexible hours for her ability to re-enter journalism and build a career. She says APTN was a place where she could "write the truth about my people," turning her back toward a career in journalism.

Her son Zackery Liberty is now an adult and a guitarist with the indie rock group Farewell Davidson.

Career

Aboriginal Peoples Television Network (APTN)

In 2000 Pugliese heard from a professor that the APTN was about to launch a weekly news magazine show called InVision. It was later rebranded into the nightly APTN National News. From 2000 to 2006 Pugliese was a member of the Press Gallery and APTN's Parliamentary Reporter. She also travelled to many Indigenous communities, mostly in Ontario, Quebec and Nunavut. During her time at APTN Pugliese won 3 Native American Journalism Awards and was nominated for a Canadian Association of Broadcasters Gold Ribbon Award. Pugliese left APTN in 2006.

360 Vision, Vision TV

In 2006, Pugliese joined Vision TV's investigative and current affairs show 360 Vision then led by Sadia Zaman and John Scully. That year the series was a nominee for Best News and Information Series at the 2006 Gemini Awards. Pugliese left after one season.

Assembly of First Nations

Pugliese joined the Assembly of First Nations as a communications officer in 2007. In this role she also worked with the World Health Organization, and the United Nations. A year later she was promoted to Communications Director. She left the AFN in 2010.

ichannel and #FAQMP

In 2010 Pugliese returned to journalism, hosting and producing @issue, ichannel's current affairs talk show. In 2011 Pugliese hosted and produced a new flagship program #FAQMP (Frequently Asked Questions for your Member of Parliament). The show was described as an experiment in democracy, and with its hyper-local focus it was favourably compared to a modern twist on Geoff Scott's 1968 Show Your Man on the Hill.  #FAQMP invited viewers to vote on a website and choose which MP they wanted to appear on the show. Viewers were then invited to submit their own interview questions and topics via social media. Among the MPs who appeared on the show were: Justin Trudeau, Jason Kenney, Dean Del Mastro, Elizabeth May, Bob Rae, Carolyn Bennett, Joy Smith, Pat Martin, and Senator Patrick Brazeau.

Some controversial episodes included: PEI Liberal MP Sean Casey's admission that he did not support his own party's 2012 resolution on abortion that would penalize any province that restricted women's access to abortion (by cutting federal health transfer dollars). Green Party Leader Elizabeth May's assertion that political parties should be eliminated, and all MPs elected independently also caused a stir. The clip resurfaced and caused debate on reddit in 2014.

The series garnered a nomination for Best Cross-Platform Project, Non-Fiction at the 1st Canadian Screen Awards.

Pugliese left in 2012, returning to APTN. #FAQMP lasted for 1 more season under a new host, Kevin O'Keefe.

Aboriginal Peoples Television Network (APTN)

In 2012, Pugliese returned to the APTN to lead the news department as the executive director of News and Current Affairs. Since her arrival, new programming has been added to the News Department including: Nation to Nation, a half hour political show, and the talk shows InFocus and The Laughing Drum. During the 2015 federal election, for the first time, APTN National News secured interviews with 3 out of 4 of the national party leaders.

In 2017, Pugliese was awarded the Canadian Association of Journalists Charles Bury Award, by then CAJ President Nick Taylor-Vaisey. In particular Taylor-Vaisey noted Pugliese's  contributions to fighting for press freedom.

"When it comes to supporting journalists and fighting for journalism, APTN punches above its weight," said Taylor-Vaisey. "They fight for press freedom in the courts..."

In her acceptance speech Pugliese recounted some of the early struggles of setting up the "first aboriginal broadcaster in the world" adding: "Yes. We punched above our weight, how could we not with so much at stake?"

Managing Editor Investigative (CBC)
As managing editor of investigative for the CBC from 2021, Pugliese oversaw The Fifth Estate, an award-winning English-language Canadian news magazine television program airing on the national CBC Television network.

Executive Editor National Observer 
Pugliese is currently the executive editor of Canada's National Observer, a daily online news service focused on climate change.

References

External links
 Carleton University Theses

Canadian television reporters and correspondents
First Nations journalists
Living people
Algonquin people
First Nations women writers
Journalists from Ontario
Writers from Ottawa
Carleton University alumni
Canadian women television journalists
Canadian Screen Award winning journalists
21st-century Canadian non-fiction writers
20th-century Canadian women
21st-century Canadian women writers
20th-century Canadian journalists
21st-century Canadian journalists
21st-century First Nations writers
Year of birth missing (living people)
American journalism awards
 
Harvard University
Journalism fellowships
Scholarships in the United States